Hissteria is the second studio album by Purling Hiss, released on September 28, 2010 by Richie Records. The album continued to explore the abrasive guitar noise of the debut across extended tracks.

Track listing

Personnel
Adapted from the Hissteria liner notes.
 Mike Polizze – vocals, instruments

Release history

References

External links 
 Hissteria at Discogs (list of releases)
 Hissteria at Bandcamp

2010 albums
Purling Hiss albums